Coral Fang is the third and most recent studio album by the punk rock band The Distillers. Following the underground success of their second album Sing Sing Death House (2002), The Distillers signed a major label record deal with Sire Records. After recruiting lead guitarist Tony "Bradley" Bevilacqua, The Distillers began recording new material between May and June 2003 with producer Gil Norton at The Site in San Rafael, California. Written and recorded amidst a period of intense media controversy surrounding the band's frontwoman Brody Dalle, Coral Fang was seen as a conscious effort to distance the band from their California scene origins following Dalle's divorce from Rancid frontman Tim Armstrong, and featured a more diverse sound primarily influenced by grunge. 

Released on October 13, 2003 in the UK, and a day later in the United States, Coral Fang received positive reviews and was a moderate commercial success, charting at number 97 on the US Billboard 200 and number 46 on the UK Albums Chart. In the latter country, Coral Fang spawned three Top 75 singles, and was later certified Silver by the BPI in 2011. The Distillers toured heavily in support of the album throughout 2003 and 2004, with appearances at Lollapalooza and at the Reading and Leeds Festivals. Following the tour cycle's conclusion, The Distillers started to fracture due to exhaustion and Dalle's worsening addictions to crystal meth, before ultimately breaking up in 2006. Coral Fang is the band's only major label studio album.

Background 
In January 2002, The Distillers released their second album, Sing Sing Death House through Hellcat Records. The album became an underground success, selling over 100,000 copies, and the band's popularity began to increase through numerous appearances on MTV and the Vans Warped Tour. After the single "City of Angels" began receiving airplay from the influential Los Angeles radio station KROQ-FM, the band began receiving offers from a number of  major labels, such as Warner Bros. Records, Sony, DreamWorks and The Island Def Jam Music Group. Despite the multitude of offers, the band was wary of these offers, as they were unsure of how invested the record label's presidents would be with the band. Ultimately, The Distillers chose to sign a two-album deal with Warner Bros. Records under their newly relaunched Sire Records imprint in October 2002, which had recently become a standalone label again after being a part of the short-lived London-Sire Records. The deal was set up as a joint venture between Sire and Hellcat. 

The band chose to sign to Sire because of their liking of Sire's history and alumni, which included the Ramones and the Dead Boys, the commitment of the Sire co-founder Seymour Stein and Warner Bros. CEO Tom Whalley to the band, and the fact that the band's A&R representative, Craig Aaronson, was the vice president of the label, which meant that Sire would likely pay more attention to the band than other labels. Upon signing to the label, the band members were immediately paid $30,000 by the label as a bonus. The band's major label signing was met with some backlash from some members of the punk scene, including the punk fanzine Maximumrocknroll, who accused the band of "selling out". Despite this, the band's frontwoman Brody Dalle was unfazed by the criticism. “Those Maximumrocknroll kids, they’re all P.C. even when they’re not trying to be P.C.,” she explained to LA Weekly. “They’re sheep. They can’t form opinions of their own. And they’re mad at me for all sorts of reasons that have nothing to do with the music.”

Tim Armstrong controversy 
Amidst the band's signing to Sire and growth in popularity, Brody Dalle (then known as Brody Armstrong)'s marriage to Rancid guitarist/vocalist and Hellcat Records owner Tim Armstrong was beginning to fall apart as Brody was less available while out on touring. "I was gone most of the time. I remember coming home from tour and Tim was like, 'I'm lonely. I miss you. You're never around.' And I was just like, "...tough shit? You're a fucking grown ass man.' I was twenty, twenty-one. And he was in his mid-thirties. 'I'm not here to fix you.' I was a kid. I was a fucking kid!" Dalle had also been planning to leave Armstrong for three years; "He's 14 years older than me, but emotionally a child ... And I didn't know any different." Dalle soon filed for divorce from Armstrong in January 2003. 

In February 2003, Dalle returned to Australia and wrote over a dozen songs for a new album. While in Australia, Dalle reconnected with Queens of the Stone Age vocalist/guitarist Josh Homme, whom she had previously met at Lollapalooza in 1996; they eventually formed a romantic relationship, which they were forced to keep secret from the public eye as Dalle was still in the process of divorcing Armstrong. Dalle and Homme publicly revealed their relationship through an image of the two kissing, which appeared in Rolling Stone (June 12, 2003). Upon seeing the Rolling Stone photograph, Tim Armstrong, along with his new partner Kelly Osbourne, began to create a surge of negative press around Dalle and Homme's relationship. Armstrong, who was greatly affected by the news of the divorce, took a temporary hiatus during the recording of Rancid's then-upcoming sixth studio album Indestructible, which was largely inspired by his split from Brody, and alleged in an interview with NME that the first he had heard or seen of Brody since their divorce was with the Rolling Stone magazine photo. The drama surrounding divorce severely damaged Brody Dalle's reputation, who was framed as "using" Armstrong, his name and connections during their six-year marriage in order to attain success; Kelly Osbourne also alleged that Tim Armstrong had ghostwritten the band's songs, a claim which Dalle dismissed as "ridiculous" and "pointless". 

The controversy created a split between the fanbases of Rancid and The Distillers, and the band became alienated from the California punk rock scene and were left "virtually friendless", according to drummer Andy Granelli. Granelli also commented on the drama to MTV News: "The thing that was a real bummer was the way some people were treating us. There was definitely a change in attitude in a lot of people and it just goes to show you that those people aren't your friends. That was a bigger letdown for all of us than anything else ... It definitely gave us some perspective of where we stand with certain people." Josh Homme was also subject to numerous death threats from Rancid fans, who accused him of "stealing" Dalle from Armstrong. Despite the intense level of controversy, Dalle remained silent on her problems with her marriage to Armstrong until an interview with The Face in February 2004.

Recording and production 

The Distillers commenced recording on a new album at The Site in San Rafael, California on May 25, 2003 with producer Gil Norton, who had produced albums for the Pixies and Foo Fighters. A few weeks prior to recording the album, The Distillers recruited Tony "Bradley" Bevilacqua, who had been the band's guitar tech for three years, as their lead guitarist. Compared to the short time-frames the band's previous albums were recorded in, Coral Fang was recorded over three weeks with Gil Norton. The band had a deadline for July 2003, as they had to participate in the Lollapalooza tour; the album was finished on June 30. After recording was completed, the album was mixed by Andy Wallace on July 21, 2003 and mastered in August in New York; by September 2003, the album was finished. During the sessions, the band revealed song titles for "Joining the Blood" (Drain the Blood), "Die on a Rope", "Cincinnati" and "Hurricane" (Deathsex).

A cover of "Walls Come Tumbling Down!" by The Style Council was initially suggested to appear on the album, but did not. Another song recorded during the Coral Fang sessions was "Cincinnati", a tribute to the city. "Every time we've been there, it's been a good experience. The people there are really cool. It's just so much different than California." While the song was not released on the album, it was instead featured on the CD single of "Drain the Blood".

Composition and lyrics 
Coral Fang was mainly described by critics as punk rock, with influences of grunge. Many critics compared Dalle to Courtney Love. Admittedly, Dalle cited Nirvana as an influence on the album's sound, confessing to The Stranger, "I love Kurt. His songwriting and his guitar playing and the songs are just fucking... aaaarg. You could live in them. That's how real they are."

Musically, The Distillers attempted to branch out beyond their typical style of punk rock and into a variety of influences. Andy Granelli's drum playing was inspired by bands such as The Beatles and Don Caballero; "I’m trying really hard in this record to not be typical, but at the same time not playing cluttered, not playing over the vocals and the guitar. With the Distillers it’s very easy to play over the melody, not let the guitar riffs speak for themselves. I’m trying to be very selective with nuances and stuff, just holding back on the off beat of something, you know?” The band stated that Coral Fang was significantly different in style different due to the increased dynamics of Brody's song writing. "[Coral Fang] is significantly different, but at the same time it's like a lot of the same stuff," Andy Granelli said. "It's still, like, angry or pissed off or aggressive. It's still that. But we played around with the dynamics with Brody's songs. She made up all these, like, really cool melodies and stuff. So there's a lot of, like, crazy melodies that she did." Similarly, Tony Bevilacqua said of the band’s musical growth to the Seattle Weekly; “Brody wrote Sing Sing Death House like three years ago, and she’s kind of grown up, and her songwriting’s really matured. Not that it was immature before, but the kind of music that she’s writing has just naturally changed, I think. Everything that she wrote on this record was what she wanted to do and what she’s been into. We like all different kinds of music; music that’s more mellow or slower, stuff that’s fast and aggressive, so it was nice to be able to do all different kinds of styles and not be confined to doing one record of all the same kind of music.” The change in sound could have also been related to Dalle's separation from Armstrong, and subsequently, the California punk scene. Dalle also saw the album as the first time she had come into her own musically; “I actually felt liberated. I felt free for the first time in my life. I felt like I was starting to become in charge of myself.” Brody would later announce on September 25, 2003, that she had decided to change her surname from "Armstrong" to Dalle", after the actress Béatrice Dalle, which was seen as a move to further detach herself from Tim Armstrong's image.

Coral Fang was noted by several publications for its recurring motifs to blood, violence and gore, alongside references to hanging and stabbing. The Chicago Tribune described the lyrics as "images of ominous violence and trembling anticipation". When asked by The Guardian about the violent themes, Dalle responded; "Well, blood represents life, and loss of it is death. The album is a snapshot of a period of intense transition." Contrary to popular assumption, Coral Fang lyrics are about Dalle's childhood and her experiences of sexual abuse. While the album was widely interpreted to be about Dalle's split with Armstrong, Dalle later clarified that only two songs on the album, "Die On a Rope" and "For Tonight You're Only Here To Know", are about him. During the album's promotion, the band refused to discuss the meanings of the songs due to the band being tired of questions about Dalle's divorce, with Ryan Sinn stating in an interview with the Seattle Weekly; "It’s kind of strange when your life is being played out in the media. Obviously people want to know about it and people are gonna write about it and stuff, and I understand that, but it’s something that [we] would rather not talk about. It’s hard. It’s really fucked.”

Title and artwork 
"Coral Fang", according to Brody Dalle, "symbolises the male anatomy." According to Tony Bevilacqua, the album's original title was "Plastic Fang", but after discovering the title was already taken by the Jon Spencer Blues Explosion, they changed it.

The artwork for Coral Fang was done by Tim Presley, who was acquainted with the band through Andy Granelli, with whom he had played with in The Nerve Agents. The cover and inside artwork is Presley's interpretation of the album's lyrics. "It is not meant to represent our political stances. Art, to us, is meant to evoke emotion and thought, and is not always open to social commentary,” explained Brody Dalle.

The artwork attracted controversy due to its explicit nature, and Sire forced the band to create a "safe cover" for the album to allow it to be sold in national chain stores. "We wanted kids in the middle of nowhere, the middle of America, to be able to buy our record at a Wal-Mart or Best Buy where its like the only place they can buy records kind of thing", Tony Bradley said, "So we had to do that for that reason. It kind of sucks, like we didn’t want to do that; but we kind’ve had to." However, this was not censorship, as, according to a band spokesperson, retailers were given the choice between the artworks; “So if Wal-Mart chooses to stock the safer cover, then that’s their choice, but technically that means there will be no banning of the other one.” On the vinyl issues of the album, a slip-cover is used.

Release and promotion 
The album title of Coral Fang was tentatively announced during recording through MTV News on June 2, 2003, and its track list and US release date of October 14 was announced on September 8, 2003 via the Warner Bros./Reprise Street Team website. A vinyl version of the album was later released via Tarantulas Records on April 26, 2004. It has since been reissued on vinyl twice; for Record Store Day 2017, limited to 4,000 copies on red vinyl, and in November 2019 by Music on Vinyl.

In the run up to the release of Coral Fang, the band was scheduled to play the Vans Warped Tour, but dropped out following the Rolling Stone cover drama, as Rancid were the headlining act of the festival. Instead, The Distillers embarked on the Lollapalooza tour from July 5 to August 10. Afterwards, the band performed a few shows in the UK in mid-August, including an intimate show at Highbury Garage, London and the V Festival. During the tour, the band began premiering seven new songs, including "Drain the Blood", "Dismantle Me" and "Coral Fang".

Three singles, along with respective music videos, were released from Coral Fang. The band chose "Drain the Blood" as the album's first single, though they were initially considering releasing "The Hunger" as the first single due to its positive reception from live audiences. It was released on September 11, 2003; the band promoted the single with a music video for the song, which premiered on MTV.com on October 1, 2003, and through a televised appearance performing the song on Jimmy Kimmel Live! on the album's release date of October 14. "The Hunger" was later released as a single on March 29, 2004. "Beat Your Heart Out" was released as the third and final single on June 7, 2004.

Commercial performance 
Coral Fang was a moderate commercial success. Coral Fang reached number 97 on the Billboard 200, becoming the band's first album to chart there, and "Drain The Blood" was able to reach number 28 on the Billboard Alternative Songs chart (becoming their only song to chart in the United States). However, owing to a lack of airplay of the album's singles on radio, Coral Fang failed to meet commercial expectations in the US, with the album only managing to sell over 100,000 copies in the United States by late 2004. The Eagle attributed Coral Fang's lacklustre US sales to Dalle's divorce controversy, commenting, "Many within circles of the groups took sides with Rancid, and time has proven thus far that perhaps many fans [of The Distillers] have done the same." In the UK, the album reached number 46 on the UK Albums Chart and produced three Top 75 singles on the UK Singles Chart, with "Drain The Blood", "The Hunger" and "Beat Your Heart Out" reaching peak positions of numbers fifty-one, forty-eight and seventy-five, respectively. On April 1, 2011, Coral Fang was certified silver by the British Phonographic Institute (BPI) to represent the sale of 60,000 copies in the UK.

Reception 
Upon its release, Coral Fang was met with largely positive reviews from critics. The album holds an overall approval rating of 71 out of 100 on online review aggregator Metacritic based on 18 reviews.

Accolades 

Awards

Track listing

Personnel
Personnel per liner notes.

The Distillers

 Brody Dalle – lead vocals, rhythm guitar
 Ryan Sinn – bass, backing vocals
 Tony "Bradley" Bevilacqua – lead guitar, backing vocals 
 Andy Granelli – drums

Production
Producer – Gil Norton
Executive producer – Tom Whalley
Engineers – Bradley Cook, John Dunne
Mixing – Andy Wallace
Mastering – Howie Weinberg
Technicians – Dan Druff, Mike Fazano
Arranger – The Distillers
Artwork
Design – Richard Scane Goodheart
Photo – James R. Minchin III
Original artwork and layout – Tim Presley

Use in media
"Drain the Blood" was featured in Gran Turismo 4 and is a downloadable song for Rock Band.
"Beat Your Heart Out" was featured in video games Tony Hawk's Underground 2, ATV Offroad Fury 3, and Spider-Man 2.
The name of the band and album is also graffitied on a wall in the console version of Spider-Man 2.
"Dismantle Me" was featured in MTX Mototrax.
"Die on a Rope" was featured in Marvel's Daredevil in the episode "Kinbaku".

Charts

Weekly charts

Singles

Notes

References

The Distillers albums
2003 albums
Albums produced by Gil Norton
Sire Records albums
Hellcat Records albums